The Comey Rule is an American political drama television miniseries, based on the book A Higher Loyalty: Truth, Lies, and Leadership by former FBI director James Comey. The miniseries stars Jeff Daniels as Comey and Brendan Gleeson as President Donald Trump. The two-part miniseries was aired from September 27 to September 28, 2020 on Showtime.

Plot
The series follows FBI director James Comey in the run-up to the 2016 election, and later in the early months of Donald Trump's presidency.

In 2015, Comey asks Mark F. Giuliano to stay on as the deputy FBI director to lead the Hillary Clinton e-mail server "Midyear" investigation.

Crossfire Hurricane in 2016 looks at George Papadopoulos, an advisor to the Trump campaign.  GRU is said to have recruited Carter Page as an asset. Paul Manafort is said to be on the payroll of Russian oligarchs Oleg Deripaska and Dmytro Firtash. The investigation finds un-corroborated evidence that the Russian government had damaging information on Donald Trump when he stayed at the Ritz-Carlton Hotel Moscow in 2013.

After closing the Midyear Clinton investigation in July 2016, the FBI re-opens the investigation in October 2016 because some Hillary Clinton server e-mails turn up in a new sexting scandal on Anthony Weiner's laptop computer.

The first episode ends with news reports that Hillary Clinton has called Donald Trump to concede the election to him.

In the second episode, the heads of the Intelligence Community tell Barack Obama that Russia wants a friendly Donald Trump in the White House to collapse NATO, end the Iran nuclear deal, allow oil drilling in the Arctic, set up a pathway for Turkish invasion against the Kurds, start a trade war with China, and sow discord above all.

Russian ambassador Sergey Kislyak lobbies Michael Flynn to end economic sanctions against Russia after Obama expels 35 Russian diplomats and announces further sanctions on Russia. After the 2016 election, James Clapper and other intel chiefs discuss the Steele dossier with Obama during a briefing at the White House.

After Trump's election in 2016, the U.S. intel chiefs meet with the Trump campaign in Trump Tower New York to state that Russian government agents are using fake social media accounts at YouTube, Facebook, Twitter, and Instagram to duplicate pro-Trump propaganda at Russia Today and Sputnik Radio. Comey also accuses the Russians of attacking the voting process itself. The FBI intercepts five phone calls during which sanctions relief was discussed while Mike Pence tells Face the Nation that the phone calls between Kislyak and Flynn were about expressing condolences for the Russian plane crash.

Trump hosts Comey for a private dinner at the White House; during the meeting, Trump demands loyalty. Afterwards, Trump fires Sally Yates. Trump tells Comey he didn't give "a billion dollars to Iran like Obama did." Trump goes on to ask Comey to drop the FBI investigation on Michael Flynn.

The second episode ends with the dismissal of Comey along with the firings, resignations, re-assignments, and retirements of several appointed officials at the FBI and DOJ.

Cast

Main
 Jeff Daniels as James Comey
 Brendan Gleeson as Donald Trump
 Holly Hunter as Sally Yates
 Michael Kelly as Andrew McCabe
 Jennifer Ehle as Patrice  Comey
 Scoot McNairy as Rod Rosenstein
 Jonathan Banks as James Clapper
 Oona Chaplin as Lisa Page
 Amy Seimetz as Trisha Anderson
 Steven Pasquale as Peter Strzok

Additional
Peter Coyote as Robert Mueller
William Sadler as Michael Flynn
T. R. Knight as Reince Priebus
Kingsley Ben-Adir as President Barack Obama
Brian d'Arcy James as Mark Giuliano
Steve Zissis as Jim Baker
Shawn Doyle as Bill Priestap
Seann Gallagher as Jim Rybicki
Damon Gupton as Jeh Johnson
Joe Lo Truglio as Jeff Sessions
Michael Hyatt as Loretta Lynch
Spencer Garrett as Bill Sweeney
John Bourgeois as John Brennan
Paul Bates as Denis McDonough
Anthony Bowden as George Papadopoulos
Harmon Walsh as Donald Trump Jr.
Phillip Riccio as Jared Kushner
Nicolas Van Burek as Stephen Miller
Richard Binsley as Alexander Downer
Shauna McDonald as Natalia Veselnitskaya
Tony Munch as Sergey Lavrov
Stass Klassen as Vladimir Putin
Harold Tausch as Mike Rogers
Andrew Di Rosa as Agent Hartz (NYFO)

Episodes

Production
It was announced in October 2019 that Billy Ray would write and direct a miniseries produced by CBS Television Studios that would adapt James Comey's autobiography A Higher Loyalty, with Jeff Daniels playing Comey. Brendan Gleeson was set to play Donald Trump, with Michael Kelly, Jennifer Ehle, Holly Hunter, Steven Pasquale, Oona Chaplin, Scoot McNairy, William Sadler, and T. R. Knight among the additional actors announced to star, and Peter Coyote playing Robert Mueller. Ray met with Comey multiple times over the course of a year to prepare the series. Filming began in Toronto in November 2019. The series' budget was $40 million.

In June 2020, the series was revealed to be named The Comey Rule, and to consist of two episodes totalling four hours. The show was originally due to premiere on Showtime after the 2020 United States presidential election. However, following criticism from Ray concerning the airdate, the series was rescheduled to premiere over two nights, beginning on September 27, 2020. In the United Kingdom, the series aired in four parts on Sky Atlantic on September 30, 2020. In Australia, the series aired the same dates as the United States on the streaming service Stan. The series aired on WOWOW in Japan on November 1, 2020. The series arrived on Netflix US on September 28, 2021.

Reception
On review aggregator Rotten Tomatoes, the series holds an approval rating of 68% based on 40 reviews, with an average rating of 6.03/10. The website's critics consensus reads, "Despite some impressive performances, The Comey Rule chaotic approach to current events clarifies very little, further obscuring the facts of already confusing circumstances without adding much insight." On Metacritic, it has a weighted average score of 58 out of 100, based on 28 critics, indicating "mixed or average reviews".

Daniel D'Addario of Variety gave the miniseries a negative review, specifying that it "bends and strains to accommodate Comey's showy displays of duty and righteousness," and that "Gleeson is at once the best and worst thing about The Comey Rule, uncannily evoking the president's aura of menace and doing so while pushing his performance past a bizarre sheath of makeup that misses the mark." Laura Miller, writing in Slate, describes the miniseries as "the story of institutions run in accordance with norms and traditions that seem permanent but prove terrifyingly fragile. Comey gets out, but the rest of us are still living in the sequel."

References

External links

2020 American television series debuts
2020 American television series endings
2020s American drama television miniseries
2020s American political television series
American biographical series
American political drama television series
Films about presidents of the United States
Media about the Trump presidency
Showtime (TV network) original programming
Television series by CBS Studios
Television shows filmed in Toronto
Television shows based on non-fiction books
Cultural depictions of Donald Trump
Cultural depictions of Vladimir Putin
Cultural depictions of Barack Obama
Television series about the Federal Bureau of Investigation
White House in fiction
Television series set in 2015
Television series set in 2016
Television series set in 2017
Television shows scored by Henry Jackman